Blood at the Orpheum is the first live album by American rock band In This Moment. The album was released digitally by Century Media on January 21, 2014. A DVD and Blu-ray of the concert was included in a special edition re-release of their fourth album Blood. A standalone limited edition DVD was released in Europe on February 17.

Background
On April 16, 2013, In This Moment announced on Facebook that they will be filming their first concert DVD at the Orpheum Theater in Madison, Wisconsin. The show was filmed on May 21 and features a special stage setup, costume changes, props, and dancers. This show marked the first appearance of the Blood girls on stage. The set list composed heavily of material from Blood and a cover of Nine Inch Nails' "Hurt", which is omitted from this release. The DVD/Blu-ray also features interviews with Maria and behind the scenes footage. The film was directed by Brad Golowin and the live audio was mixed and mastered by producer Kevin Churko.

A trailer was released to YouTube on December 23 and a performance of "Beautiful Tragedy" was released on January 10.

Track listing

Video track listing
Intro ("It Is Written"/"Rise with Me")
"Adrenalize"
"Blazin'"
"Beast Within"
"Beautiful Tragedy"
"Into the Light"
"The Blood Legion"
"The Gun Show"
"Whore"
Shadow dance
"Burn"
"Blood"
Ending credits ("Whore")

Personnel
In This Moment
Maria Brink – lead vocals, piano
Chris Howorth – lead guitar, backing vocals
Tom Hane – drums
Randy Weitzel – rhythm guitar
Travis Johnson – bass guitar

Additional personnel
 Kevin Churko – mastering, mixing, production, recording

References

In This Moment albums
2014 live albums